The Empire Award for Best Newcomer (formerly known as Best Debut) was an Empire Award presented annually by the British film magazine Empire to honor a director with a breakthrough film or an actor who has delivered a breakthrough performance while working within the film industry. The Empire Award for Best Newcomer was first introduced at the 1st Empire Awards ceremony in 1996 with Bryan Singer receiving the award for his direction of The Usual Suspects and last presented at the 16th Empire Awards ceremony in 2011. Winners were voted by the readers of Empire magazine.

Since its inception, the award has been given to two male directors, eight actors, seven actresses and one film crew. Gemma Arterton was the only individual to be nominated two times, at the 13th and 14th Empire Awards ceremonies in 2008 and 2009 respectively. Twice two awards were handed out at the same year. The first time was at the 5th Empire Awards ceremony in 2000 where there was a tie between Carrie-Anne Moss and the crew of East Is East and the second time was at the 12th Empire Awards ceremony in 2007 where the award was split to Best Male and Best Female newcomers. Chloë Grace Moretz was the last winner in this category for her roles in Kick-Ass and Let Me In.

Award history
The award was named "Best Debut" between the 1st Empire Awards in 1996 and the 7th Empire Awards in 2002 and was changed to "Best Newcomer". In 2000, 2007 and 2012, the category was split to "Best Male Newcomer" and "Best Female Newcomer".

Winners and nominees
In the list below, winners are listed first in boldface, followed by the other nominees. The number of the ceremony (1st, 2nd, etc.) appears in parentheses after the awards year, linked to the article (if any) on that ceremony.

1990s

2000s

2010s

Gender and role superlatives

Notes

References

External links

Newcomer
Film awards for male debut actors
Film awards for debut actress
Directorial debut film awards